Arconcey is a commune in the Côte-d'Or department in the Bourgogne-Franche-Comté region of eastern France.

The inhabitants of the commune are known as Arconceyens or Arconceyennes

Geography
Arconcey is located some 12 km north of Arnay-le-Duc and some 20 km east by south east of Saulieu. Access to the commune is by the D16 road from Allerey in the south passing through the village and continuing north-east to Thoisy-le-Désert. The D36 also goes from Allerey north through the western part of the commune and continuing to Beurey-Bauguay. The D115A links the village to the D36. Apart from the village there are also the hamlets of Juilly, Laneau, and Avincey. The commune is mostly farmland with a large forest in the south (Bois des Bates) and small forests scattered through the commune.

Neighbouring communes and villages

Administration

List of Successive Mayors

Demography
In 2017 the commune had 222 inhabitants.

Culture and heritage

Civil heritage
The commune has a number of buildings and structures that are registered as historical monuments:
A Bridge (1857)
A Chateau and Farm (19th century)
A School (19th century)

Religious heritage

The commune has several religious buildings and structures that are registered as historical monuments:
The Parish Church of the Assumption (11th century). The Church contains a very large number of items that are registered as historical objects.
A Wayside Cross at Rue du Lavoir (19th century)
A Church (12th century)
A Wayside Cross at Lanneau (1845)
A Wayside Cross at Juilly (1789)
A Wayside Cross at Avincey (1865)
A Wayside Cross (19th century)
A Wayside Cross (19th century)

Gallery of Historical Objects in the Church

See also
Communes of the Côte-d'Or department

References

External links
Arconcey on the National Geographic Institute website 
Arconcey on Géoportail, National Geographic Institute (IGN) website 
Arconcey on the 1750 Cassini Map

Communes of Côte-d'Or